Liam Kearns (1962 – 12 March 2023) was an Irish Gaelic football manager and player. He managed Offaly from 2022 until his death in 2023.

Kearns previously managed the Limerick, Laois and Tipperary county teams, as well as several clubs in different counties. He led Tipperary to a 2016 All-Ireland Senior Football Championship semi-final, the county's first since 1935. After leaving Tipperary and before being appointed Offaly manager, Kearns managed Clann na nGael GAA (Roscommon).

Early life
Kearns's father Ollie captained Kerry to an All-Ireland MFC final in the late 1950s. His father Ollie was then a wing-forward on the Graiguecullen team that won their last Laois Senior Football Championship title in 1965.

Playing career
As a player, Liam Kearns was a member of the Austin Stacks club and played for the Kerry minor team for two years, winning an All-Ireland Minor Football Championship (MFC) with them in 1980.

Kearns graduated to become a member of the Kerry under-21 and senior football panels and won a Kerry Senior Football Championship medal with Austin Stacks in 1986.

Managerial career

Limerick
Kearns coached the Na Piarsaigh club to the Limerick Under-21 Football Championship in 1997, the club's only under-21 county football title. That team included Declan Lynch (Head of Sports Medicine Bath Rugby), Mike Prendergast (Munster Rugby coach), Ian Costello (former Munster Rugby backs coach) and Comdt Joe Mullins, who captained it.

Kearns turned Limerick into the second team in Munster as they outflanked Cork.

Kearns managed the Limerick under-21 team to successive Munster titles and to an appearance in the All-Ireland Under-21 Football Championship final. In 2003 he led Limerick to a Division 2 National Football League (NFL) final, where they were beaten by Westmeath on the same day that Laois lost to Tyrone in the Division 1 decider.

The following year he led Limerick to a defeat of Laois in a Division 1 NFL tie at the Gaelic Grounds, and, that year, Limerick reached the Munster Senior Football Championship final, which they lost on a replay to Kerry.

Kearns spent six years managing Limerick and helped to raise the county's profile.

Laois
Tralee man Kearns (whose mother is from Laois) was appointed Mick O'Dwyer's successor as senior Laois county football team manager in September 2006. In being appointed he saw off the challenge of former Laois player Pat Roe, who had a successful spell in charge of Wexford. Laois reached the finals of both the O'Byrne Cup and Leinster SFC in his first season as manager: calls for Kearns to be sacked after one season, with former players and club delegates saying "the man has to go", went unheeded. He lasted until August 2008.

Tipperary
Kearns led Aherlow to the 2010 Tipperary Senior Football Championship title.

In November 2015, Kearns was named as manager of the Tipperary senior football team.
In June 2016, Tipperary reached the Munster SFC final after a 3–15 to 2–16 win against Cork. They went on to defeat Derry by a scoreline of 1–21 to 2–17 in round 3A of the qualifiers to reach the All-Ireland SFC quarter-finals for the first time. On 31 July 2016, Tipperary defeated Galway in the All-Ireland SFC quarter-final at Croke Park to reach a first All-Ireland SFC semi-final since 1935. On 21 August 2016, Mayo defeated Tipperary in the semi-final by a scoreline of 2–13 to 0–14.

On 8 April 2017, Tipperary won the Division 3 final of the 2017 National Football League after a 3–19 to 0–19 win against Louth at Croke Park.

On 9 June 2019, Kearns resigned as Tipperary senior football team manager after defeat to Down in the 2019 All-Ireland Senior Football Championship.

After resigning as Tipperary manager, Kearns became manager of Roscommon GAA club Clann na nGael.

Offaly
On 11 August 2022, Kearns was announced as Offaly manager, succeeding John Maughan.

Honours

Player

Austin Stacks
Kerry Senior Football Championship: 1986

Kerry
All-Ireland Minor Football Championship: 1980
Munster Minor Football Championship: 1980

Management

Na Piarsaigh
Limerick Under-21 Football Championship: 1997

Aherlow
Tipperary Senior Football Championship: 2010

Limerick
Munster Under-21 Football Championship: 2000

Tipperary
National Football League Division 3: 2017

References

1962 births
2023 deaths
Austin Stacks Gaelic footballers
Kerry inter-county Gaelic footballers
Gaelic football coaches
Gaelic football managers